Upton is a small village in Nottinghamshire, England,  east of Southwell,  west of Newark and  south of Hockerton; it lies on the A612 Nottingham-Newark road. In 1889, the village was described as sitting on a bend in the main road, "on the summit of a hill which commands a fine view of the Trent Valley... . The church, which is a prominent feature in the landscape, has a substantial Perpendicular tower crowned by eight pinnacles, and having in the centre a lofty master pinnacle which rises above its neighbours, and so adds materially to the effect."

The village had a population of 425 at the 2011 census. The parish church of St Peter and St Paul is 13th century, built in the Perpendicular style. The tower of the church was also used as a dovecote. There is also a village hall and a public house (The Cross Keys). It is also the home of the British Horological Institute based at Upton Hall. What once was the village shop is now a private house.
Upton Mill was a wooden postmill built c. 1814. Still in use in 1905 the body of the mill had gone by 1911, the roundhouse being re-roofed and retained as a store.

Historical
In 1852, Upton was described as "a handsome village and parish, pleasantly situated on a gentle declivity, two and a half miles east of Southwell. There are a few other small freeholders, but it is mostly copy hold under the Archbishop, or leasehold under the Chapter of Southwell. The latter are appropriators and patrons of the vicarage, which is valued in the King's books at £4 11s 5½d, now at £91, and is enjoyed by the Rev. Frederick William Naylor, who erected a neat Sunday School in the village, and resides at the vicarage house, a neat mansion erected a few years ago. The church is a small gothic fabric, dedicated to St Peter, with a chancel and handsome tower, in which are four bells. There is a small Methodist chapel. Upton Hall is the delightful seat of the Dowager Lady Galway. It is a large, elegant mansion, surrounded with pleasure grounds, from which extensive and beautiful prospects are seen. It was built by the late Thomas Wright Esq., on the site of the old manor house. J.C. Wood of Normanton, and W. Esam of Averham Park have estates here."

Notable residents 
Fiona Thornewill, explorer who skied to the South Pole

References

External links

 British Horological Institute
 A 1913 historical article by Harry Gill

 
Villages in Nottinghamshire
Civil parishes in Nottinghamshire
Newark and Sherwood